Skippers Aviation is a small regional airline based out of Perth Airport that specialises in charter flights for companies with fly-in fly-out workers. They also operate flights for the mining industry in Western Australia, as well as some scheduled regular public transport (RPT) flights. Primarily serving the northern Goldfields, Skippers also has a secondary base in Broome in order to service the Kimberley region.

Services 

Skippers Aviation is the largest provider of fly-in fly-out services for the mining industry in Western Australia. It operates many weekly flights in support of many major mining companies and mine sites.

As of January 2020, Skippers Aviation also operates scheduled services to the following regional destinations out of Perth and Broome:

 Fitzroy Crossing
 Halls Creek
 Laverton
 Leonora
 Meekatharra
 Mount Magnet
 Wiluna

Fleet 
As of August 2019 the Skippers Aviation fleet consists of the following aircraft:

3 Cessna 441 Conquest II (based out of Broome)
4 de Havilland Canada DHC-8-100 Dash 8
6 de Havilland Canada/Bombardier DHC-8-300 Dash 8
6 Embraer EMB 120ER Brasilia (Fleet placed into long-term storage December 2020)
5 Fairchild SA227-DC Metro 23
2 Fokker 100

Total: 26 aircraft

Incidents 
 On 26 June 2007 an Embraer Brasilia (VH-XUE) on a charter flight was executing a go-around at Jundee Airstrip in Western Australia. During the go-around the crew experienced difficulties in controlling the aircraft, with the aircraft descending to 50 feet above the ground and the bank angle reaching 40 degrees. After regaining control, the crew realised that the left engine had stopped. The cause of the engine stoppage was fuel starvation.
 On 19 March 2014 a De Havilland DHC-8 (VH-XFX) approaching Perth had a "near-miss" with an object that was moving towards the aircraft. The crew identified visually the object, which was not detected by the TCAS, and took evasive action to avoid collision. Though presumed to be a UAV, the Australian Transport Safety Bureau (ATSB) investigation was unable to confirm the nature of the object. The ATSB raised concerns about risks posed by unregulated operation of UAVs.

See also
List of airlines of Australia

References

External links

Skippers Aviation official website

Regional Aviation Association of Australia
Airlines of Western Australia
Airlines established in 1990
Australian companies established in 1990
Companies based in Perth, Western Australia